Azamat Dauletbekov is a Kazakhstani freestyle wrestler. He won one of the bronze medals in the men's 86kg event at the 2022 World Wrestling Championships held in Belgrade, Serbia. He is also a three-time medalist, including gold, at the Asian Wrestling Championships.

Career 

He won the silver medal in his event at the 2017 Asian Wrestling Championships held in New Delhi, India. In 2018, he won one of the bronze medals in his event at the Asian Wrestling Championships held in Bishkek, Kyrgyzstan. He lost his bronze medal match at the 2020 Asian Wrestling Championships held in New Delhi, India.

He competed at the 2021 Asian Wrestling Olympic Qualification Tournament held in Almaty, Kazakhstan hoping to qualify for the 2020 Summer Olympics in Tokyo, Japan. He did not qualify at this tournament and he also failed to qualify for the Olympics at the World Olympic Qualification Tournament held in Sofia, Bulgaria.

He won the gold medal in his event at the 2022 Asian Wrestling Championships held in Ulaanbaatar, Mongolia. He also won the gold medal in his event at the 2022 Tunis Ranking Series event held in Tunis, Tunisia. He won one of the bronze medals in the men's 86kg event at the 2022 World Wrestling Championships held in Belgrade, Serbia.

Achievements

References

External links
 

Living people
1994 births
Place of birth missing (living people)
Kazakhstani male sport wrestlers
World Wrestling Championships medalists
Asian Wrestling Championships medalists
21st-century Kazakhstani people